The Battle of Velletri occurred on 12 August 1744 in the War of the Austrian Succession, between Austria and the Kingdom of Naples. After seizing Velletri in a nighttime attack and capturing much of King Charles' royal entourage, the Austrian army joined battle with Charles' army outside the city. The Austrians were rapidly thrown back and retreated north toward Rome with Charles in pursuit.

The surprise on Monte Piccolo 
On 17 June, as darkness fell, 12,000 troops moved towards the fortifications of Monte Piccolo. At dawn the Walloon greneers of the Spanish regiments occupied the battery of Monte Piccolo, while other troops occupied the Artemisio Male, La Fajola and set fire to the Pratoni del Vivaro, the commander of the Monte Piccolo garrison (Jan. Pestaluzzi) was captured, probably drunk in a farmhouse of winemakers. The next day, Jean Thierry du Mont, comte de Gages gave the order to withdraw and preserve only the Artemisio ridge line.

Legacy

Raimondo di Sangro took part in the battle of Velletri, distinguishing himself for his courage and skill. Act 3 of the drama Don Álvaro o la fuerza del sino Ángel de Saavedra, Duke of Rivas, and the opera La forza del destino by Giuseppe Verdi, based on Saavedra's play, is set during the Battle of Velletri.

References

Velletri
Velletri
Velletri
1744 in Europe
Velletri
Velletri
1744 in Italy